Minko may refer to:

 Christopher Minko (born 1956), Australian musician
 Estelle Nze Minko (born 1991), French handball player
 John Minko (born 1953), American radio announcer
 Oleg Minko (1938–2013), Ukrainian painter 
 Tamara Minko, professor at Rutgers University
 Valeri Minko (born 1971), Russian footballer